The 2020 United States presidential election in Michigan was held on Tuesday, November 3, 2020, as part of the 2020 United States presidential election in which all 50 states plus the District of Columbia participated. Michigan voters chose electors to represent them in the Electoral College via a popular vote, pitting the Republican Party's nominee, incumbent President Donald Trump of Florida, and his running mate, Vice President Mike Pence of Indiana against Democratic Party nominee, former Vice President Joe Biden of Delaware, and his running mate, Senator Kamala Harris of California. Michigan has 16 electoral votes in the Electoral College.

In 2016, Trump became the first Republican to carry Michigan since 1988, when George H. W. Bush scored a decisive nationwide win against Michael Dukakis. Throughout the campaign, Biden touted his work on the auto bailout in manufacturing towns outside Detroit. Appearing with United Auto Workers, Biden presented a new proposal to penalize American companies for moving manufacturing and service jobs overseas and then selling their products back in the United States. Polls of Michigan throughout the campaign generally indicated a clear Biden lead. Prior to election day, most news organizations considered Michigan a likely blue state, or a state that Biden was likely to win.

Biden ultimately carried Michigan by a 2.78% margin. Per exit polls by the Associated Press, Biden's strength in Michigan came from union households, who composed 21% of the electorate and supported Biden by 56%–42%. Biden was also able to boost minority turnout, consequently winning 93% of Black American voters. Many voters were also concerned with the COVID-19 pandemic, which had hit the state hard; 52% of voters felt the pandemic was not under control at all, and these voters broke for Biden by 82%–16%. Trump outperformed his polling average in the state, but it was not enough to win. Michigan marks Biden's strongest performance in a state that Trump carried in 2016, even voting to the left of Nevada which Trump failed to carry in said election.

Biden flipped the counties of Leelanau, Kent, and Saginaw and became the first Democrat since Woodrow Wilson in 1916 to win the presidency without winning Bay or Gogebic Counties, the first Democrat since Harry S. Truman in 1948 to win without Monroe County, the first Democrat since John F. Kennedy in 1960 to win without Lake County, the first Democrat since Jimmy Carter in 1976 to win without Calhoun, Isabella, Manistee, Shiawassee, or Van Buren Counties, and the first Democrat since Bill Clinton in 1992 and 1996 to win without winning Macomb or Eaton Counties, respectively.

With Ohio, Florida, and Iowa backing the losing candidate for the first time since 1960, 1992, and 2000 respectively, this election established Michigan, Wisconsin, and Pennsylvania as the states with the longest bellwether streak still in effect today. The last time any of them voted against the winning candidate was 2004, when all three voted for losing Democrat John Kerry.

Michigan's overall vote in for this election was 1.6% more Republican than the nation-at-large.

Primary elections
The primary elections were on March 10, 2020.

Republican primary

Democratic primary
Bernie Sanders and former Vice President Joe Biden were the two major declared Democratic candidates.

General election

Final predictions

Polling

Graphical summary

Aggregate polls

2020 polls

2017–2019 polls

Donald Trump vs. Michael Bloomberg

Donald Trump vs. Cory Booker

Donald Trump vs. Pete Buttigieg

Donald Trump vs. Kamala Harris

Donald Trump vs. Amy Klobuchar

Donald Trump vs. Beto O'Rourke

Donald Trump vs. Bernie Sanders

Donald Trump vs. Elizabeth Warren

with Donald Trump, Joe Biden, and Justin Amash

with Donald Trump, Joe Biden, and Howard Schultz

with Donald Trump, Bernie Sanders, and Howard Schultz

with Donald Trump and Generic Democrat

with Donald Trump and Generic Opponent

General election results

By county

Counties that flipped from Republican to Democratic
Leelanau (largest municipality: Greilickville)
Kent (largest municipality: Grand Rapids)
Saginaw (largest municipality: Saginaw)

By congressional district 
Despite losing the state, Trump won 8 out of the 14 congressional districts in Michigan, including one that elected a Democrat.

Analysis
Michigan was generally seen as one of the most critical states of the 2020 election; the state boasts a highly prized 16 electoral votes, and had been part of the blue wall since Bill Clinton won the state in 1992. It was key to Trump's surprise victory in 2016, and the Biden campaign paid heavy attention to the state throughout the campaign, looking to avoid a repeat of Hillary Clinton's collapse in the northern industrial states.

Biden would carry the state by about 2.8%; while Biden ran well behind Barack Obama in his two campaigns, his margin of victory was in-line for a Democratic candidate, only performing slightly worse than John Kerry's 3.4% margin in 2004, and Al Gore's 5.2% margin in 2000, reflecting some of the steady demographic shifts in the state. Many undecided/third-party voters that had been lost by Clinton appeared to return to the Democratic column, giving Biden enough votes to carry the state.

While Michigan returned to the Democratic column with a fairly sizable margin, the state's internal politics shifted rather dramatically. Trump performed strongly with white voters without a college degree, winning this group by 17 points, and this group made up about 51% of Michigan's electorate, cementing the white-working-class shift to the GOP; with men, this was even more convincing, as Trump carried white men without a college degree by 30 points. On the other hand, there was a significant suburban shift towards the Democrats; for example, Ottawa County, a suburban county outside of Grand Rapids, has traditionally been a GOP-stronghold in the state; Biden cut into Trump's margins here, and Trump carried this county with less than 60%. Trump held Macomb County, which famously helped him clinch Michigan in 2016, but carried it by only 8 points, 3 points fewer than in 2016.

Other demographic patterns remained the same. Biden won 93% of African-American voters in the state; consequently, Biden improved from Clinton's performance in Wayne County, home of Detroit. Biden's performance among black voters would carry on in other parts of the state; Biden was able to match Clinton's performance in Genesee County, and flipped back Saginaw County.

Biden performed strongly with Michigan's different religious groups; Biden was able to improve from Clinton in the vote share with Evangelical Michiganders. More importantly, Biden performed strongly with white Catholics, who make up a large portion of Michigan's electorate. Much of the state's sizable Muslim and Arab American voters backed Biden in the election, in which their support was seen as being important for helping Biden secure victory in Michigan.

Jeremy W. Peters of The New York Times wrote that "high Detroit turnout" was a crucial factor aiding Biden. African Americans in Detroit were a major demographic contributing to Joe Biden winning that state. Trump received 12,600 votes in Detroit proper, an increase from the previous election's 7,700. In percentage terms, the shift in Detroit was from Clinton 95–3 to Biden 94–5, a decreased margin from 92 points in 2016 to 89 in 2020. Biden saw increases from 2016 in Oakland and Washtenaw counties.

In Oakland County, Biden won 433,982 votes, making up 56.36% of the votes. The municipalities in Oakland County that majority-voted for Biden versus Trump included Bloomfield Township, Farmington Hills, Madison Heights, Novi, Rochester Hills, Southfield and Troy.

The number of unbalanced votes in Wayne County for 2020 was below the same number for 2016. On November 23, 2020, Michigan certified the results 3–0, with Norm Shinkle abstaining.

Aftermath
On November 5, a state judge in Michigan dismissed the Trump campaign's lawsuit requesting a pause in vote-counting to allow access to observers, as the judge noted that vote-counting had already finished in Michigan. That judge also noted the official complaint did not state "why", "when, where, or by whom" an election observer was allegedly blocked from observing ballot-counting in Michigan.

In Antrim County, human error led to a miscount of an unofficial tally of votes for the presidential candidates. The error was caused by a worker using different kinds of ballots when setting up ballot scanners and result-reporting systems, therefore mismatched results were produced. The errors were spotted and rectified, thus the unofficial tally was changed from a Biden victory in the county to a Trump victory.

Despite pressure from the Trump campaign to hand the decision over the state's presidential electors to the Michigan State Legislature, which would have been an unprecedented maneuver in state history, the statewide results were certified in favor of the Biden/Harris ticket on November 23, with one Republican member of the Michigan Board of State Canvassers abstaining.

See also
 United States presidential elections in Michigan
 Presidency of Joe Biden
 2020 Michigan elections
 2020 United States elections
 2020 Democratic Party presidential primaries
 2020 Republican Party presidential primaries
 2020 United States elections

Notes
Partisan clients

Voter samples and additional candidates

References

Further reading
 . (describes 2016 political geography of Detroit; Detroit suburbs; the Middle; the Thumb; the West; Upper Peninsula and North)
 
 . (describes bellwether Kent County, Michigan)

External links
  (state affiliate of the U.S. League of Women Voters)
 
 
 

Michigan
2020
Presidential